"Santería" is a song recorded by Spanish singer Lola Índigo, featuring Chilean singer Denise Rosenthal and Mexican singer Danna Paola. It was released on 28 August 2020, under the distribution of the label Universal Music, as an advancement of the second studio album of Lola Índigo.

Background and release 
In April 2020, Danna Paola confirms a new collaboration with the artists Lola Índigo and Denise Rosenthal, called "Santería".

Composition 
The single was produced by Mango and Nabález, while song mixing was made by Mosty. Musically is based on the urban music (reggaeton), with the use of compressed voices. Lyrically the single approaches the characteristic empowerment of the artists. "Santería is an invitation to that all womens feels like queens in his spaces... is a way of make visible the work of partners" commented Denise Rosenthal about the single.

Music video 
The music video, published on the same day of single's release, shows images of the Acrópolis of México, the Morroco's pavilion of the Expo Sevilla and the Andes mountains on Chile. It was directed by Álvaro Paz.

Charts

Certifications

Awards and nominations

Release history

References 

Latin pop songs
Pop songs
Spanish-language songs
2020 songs
2020 singles
Lola Índigo songs
Denise Rosenthal songs
Danna Paola songs
Universal Music Spain singles